Alicia Verónica Rubio Calle (born 13 January 1962) is a Spanish politician for Vox who has served as a member of the Assembly of Madrid since 2019.

Biography
Rubio was born on January 13, 1962, in Logroño. She graduated with a degree in she graduated in philology from the University of Salamanca in 1986.

She is a member of the national executive of Vox and has been the party spokeswoman on the issue of social mobility. In 2019, she was elected to the Assembly of Madrid.

References

Vox (political party) politicians
Members of the 11th Assembly of Madrid
Members of the 12th Assembly of Madrid
University of Salamanca alumni
People from Logroño
1962 births
Living people